EtherApe is a packet sniffer/network traffic monitoring tool, developed for Unix. EtherApe is free, open source software developed under the GNU General Public License.

Functionality 
Network traffic is displayed using a graphical interface. Each node represents a specific host. Links represent connections to hosts. Nodes and links are color-coded to represent different protocols forming the various types of traffic on the network. Individual nodes and their connecting links grow and shrink in size with increases and decreases in network traffic.

History 
Originally authored by Juan Toledo, the first version of EtherApe (version 0.0.1) was released on February 18, 2000. In a 2006 survey, Insecure.org named EtherApe number 43 on its list of the "Top 100 Network Security Tools".

Features 
Some of the features listed about EtherApe include (the following list refers to version 0.9.20 of EtherApe):
 graphical network traffic display
 color-coded node and links for most used protocols
 optional background image
 traffic may be viewed on one's own network, end to end (IP) or port to port (TCP)
 a variety of frame and packet types are supported
 data view can be manipulated using a network filter
 clicking a node or link provides additional information regarding including protocol and traffic information
 summary protocol and node table
 can read traffic from a file or an actual network
 handles traffic on Ethernet, WLAN, VLAN plus several other media and encapsulation types
 supports both IPv4 and IPv6
 XML export of node, link and traffic statistics
 "central node ring" mode.
 "column" mode.
 optional name resolving using c-ares library
 packet capture and display run on different processes

Security 
EtherApe requires root privileges to capture packets (but not to replay captured files). Starting with release 0.9.15 capturing is delegated to a separate process, while the main interface can run with lower privileges, significantly reducing the risk associated with capturing packets from untrusted sources (e.g. Internet).

See also 

Comparison of packet analyzers
tcpdump, a packet analyzer
Ngrep, a tool that can match regular expressions within the network packet payloads
netsniff-ng, a free Linux networking toolkit
Wireshark, a GUI based alternative to tcpdump
dsniff, a packet sniffer and set of traffic analysis tools

References 

Free network-related software
Free network management software
Packet analyzer software that uses GTK